The 2005–06 Hong Kong Elite Youth League was the second of the Hong Kong Elite Youth League.

Fixtures and results

League table 

Youth
2005-06